ZNY-FM is a Hot AC radio station in Nassau, Bahamas.

External links 
 

Radio stations in the Bahamas
Hot adult contemporary radio stations
Radio stations established in 2012